Dirty Womans Creek is a stream in the U.S. state of South Dakota.

Some say Dirty Womans Creek was named for a dirty female cook, while others believe the creek's name refers to a dirty Indian woman who settled there.

See also
List of rivers of South Dakota

References

Rivers of Haakon County, South Dakota
Rivers of South Dakota